Uma, or Parvati, is a Hindu goddess. 

UMA or Uma may also refer to:

Arts and entertainment

Fictional characters
 Uma, in the video game The Witcher 3: Wild Hunt
 Uma, in the American children's TV series Oobi
 Miss Uma, a character from the manga series Crayon Shin-chan
 Uma, in the film Descendants 2

Film
 Horse (1941 film) (Japanese: Uma), a Japanese film 
 Uma, a 2013 Nepali film by Tsering Rhitar Sherpa
 Uma (2018 film), a Bengali film

Other uses in arts and entertainment
 Uma (game), a wrestling game in Hawaii
 Urban Music Awards, a music awards ceremony

Businesses and organisations

Businesses
 UMA Engineering Ltd., now AECOM
 Universal Music Australia, a music corporation

Education
 Umeå School of Architecture, Sweden
 University of Madeira (UMa)
 University of Maine at Augusta, United States
 University of Málaga, pain
 University of Mannheim, Germany
 University of Mohaghegh Ardabili, Iran

Other organisations
 Arab Maghreb Union (Union du Maghreb arabe), a political and economic union
 Ukrainian Museum-Archives, a museum in Cleveland, Ohio, U.S.

People
 Uma (given name), including a list of people with the name
 Uma (actress) (Uma Shankari, fl from 2000), Indian actress

Science and technology
 Uma (lizard), the genus of fringe-toed lizards
 Unlicensed Mobile Access, a protocol that extends mobile voice, data and multimedia over IP networks
 Ursa Major (UMa), a constellation in the northern sky
 Uniform memory access, a shared memory architecture in parallel computers
 Upper memory area, in DOS memory management
 User-Managed Access, an access management protocol standard
  Unified memory architecture, a synonym of "integrated graphics"
 Unified Memory Architecture, in a graphics processing unit

Other uses
 Uma (Gajo house), the traditional house in Sumatra
 Uma longhouse, the traditional house in Siberut, Indonesia
 Uma (goddess), or Parvati, in Hinduism
 Uma language, an Austronesian language of Sulawesi, Indonesia
 Uma District, Ehime, a district in Japan
 Unified managed account, a type of investment account
 Cyclone Uma, a 1987 tropical cyclone which damaged Port Vila, Vanuatu
 Río Uma, a tributary of the Minho river in Spain
 Huma, North Macedonia, or Uma, a village

See also
 Una (disambiguation)
 Hunna, a French saint
 Oona, a given name
 Oonagh, a given name
 Ooma, a telecommunications company
 Uma Baka' people, in Borneo
 Uma’ Lasan language, of Borneo